The Four Power Agreement on Berlin, also known as the Berlin Agreement or the Quadripartite Agreement on Berlin, was agreed on 3 September 1971 by the four wartime Allied powers, represented by their ambassadors. The four foreign ministers, Alec Douglas-Home of the United Kingdom, Andrei Gromyko of the Soviet Union, Maurice Schumann of France, and William P. Rogers of the United States signed the agreement and put it into force at a ceremony in Berlin on 3 June 1972. The agreement was not a treaty and required no formal ratification.

Overview 

By reconfirming the post-1945 existence of the rights and responsibilities of the Four Powers for the future of Berlin and Germany as a whole, which the Soviets had earlier claimed to have abrogated (as a result of the Berlin crisis of 1959–1962), the Agreement laid the foundation for a series of East-West agreements which ushered in the period usually known as Détente. It also re-established ties between East and West Berlin, improved travel and communications between the two parts of the city and brought numerous improvements for the residents of the Western Sectors.

In order to reach such improvements, the ultimate political definition of the status of Berlin was purposely left vague, thus it preserved the differing legal positions of the two sides. The word "Berlin" does not appear in the text. The city of Berlin is identified only as the "relevant area."

The Quadripartite Agreement is drawn up "in the English, French and Russian languages, all texts being equally authentic." Thus, there is no authentic text in the German language. The translations used by the then-extant two German states had some differences.

After the agreement entered into force, the Soviet Union used this vague wording in an effort to loosen West Berlin's ties with the Federal Republic of Germany. However, the agreement contributed greatly both to a reduction of tensions between East and West over Berlin and to expanded contacts between the two parts of Germany. As such, it made an important contribution to the process that resulted in the reunification of Germany in 1990.

Along with the Allied agreement, the Basic Treaty (effective June 1973) recognized two German states, and the two countries pledged to respect one another's sovereignty. Previously, both had competing and evolving degrees of pretensions to be the sole legitimate German state. Under the terms of the treaty, diplomatic missions were to be exchanged and commercial, tourist, cultural, and communications relations established. Under the agreement and the treaty, in September 1973, both German states joined the United Nations.

These treaties were part of a breakthrough series of international agreements which were seen by some as formalizing the Cold War's division of Europe, while others saw this as the start of the process that led to the end of the Cold War. M. E. Sarotte wrote in 2001 that "...despite all the fears, both sides managed to make many bargains as a result of the détente dialogue."

While Part II of the agreement stated that the further development of the relationship between the Federal Republic of Germany and West Berlin, whereby West Berlin was still not part in the sense of a constitutive part of the Federal Republic and could not be governed by the federal government, at the same time de facto - not registered in itself - it was established that the further development of relations between the German Democratic Republic and East Berlin, with East Berlin still not being part of the German Democratic Republic in the sense of a constitutive part and also not being governed by the GDR.

See also 

 Four Power (disambiguation)
 Treaty of Moscow (1970)
 Treaty of Warsaw (1970)
 Basic Treaty, 1972
 Transit Agreement (1972)
 Potsdam Conference
 Potsdam Agreement
 Council of Foreign Ministers
 Allied Control Council
 Allied Kommandatura
 Treaty on the Final Settlement With Respect to Germany
 Steinstücken

Footnotes

References

External links 

 Text des Viermächte-Abkommens E-text of the Agreement in German
 Ostpolitik: The Quadripartite Agreement of September 3, 1971 U.S Embassy Germany
 Convention on the Privileges and Immunities of the United Nations Note 4 gives details of the impact of this Agreement on the assession of East and West Germany to this Convention and other international treaties which effected the international status of West Berlin.
 Site of the Four Power Talks on the Status of Berlin. Photo series on the 1970 treaty sessions.

Allied occupation of Germany
Political history of Germany
1971 in Germany
1971 treaties
Treaties of the United States
Treaties of the Soviet Union
Treaties of the United Kingdom
Treaties of France
1971 in France
1971 in the United Kingdom
1971 in the Soviet Union
1971 in the United States
Soviet Union–United Kingdom relations
Soviet Union–United States relations
France–Soviet Union relations
Politics of Berlin
Cold War treaties
History of East Germany
Treaties concluded in 1971
Treaties entered into force in 1972
1972 in politics
1970s in Berlin